Ghulam Rehman (born 8 October 1990) is a Pakistani cricketer. He made his List A debut for Multan in the 2018–19 Quaid-e-Azam One Day Cup on 13 September 2018. He was the leading wicket-taker for Multan in tournament, with fourteen dismissals in seven matches.

References

External links
 

1990 births
Living people
Pakistani cricketers
Multan cricketers
Place of birth missing (living people)